Broadmeadows railway station may refer to:

Broadmeadows railway station, Adelaide
Broadmeadows railway station, Melbourne
should not be confused with Broadmeadow railway station in Newcastle, New South Wales